Almost open may refer to:
Almost open map
Almost open set